China Petrochemical Corporation or Sinopec Group is the world's largest oil refining, gas and petrochemical conglomerate, administered by SASAC for the State Council of the People's Republic of China. It is headquartered at Chaoyangmenwai in Beijing, across the road from the headquarters of fellow state-owned oil company and competitor CNOOC Group.

Sinopec Group ranked the 2nd in the Fortune Global 500 List in 2020, with revenue over US$407 billion. In the 2020 Forbes Global 2000, Sinopec was ranked as the 60th largest public company in the world.

According to the Fortune Global 500 list in 2021, Sinopec was the largest energy company in the world by revenue, the largest state-owned enterprise in both China and the world, and second largest company in the world in terms of revenue, behind only American retail store chain Walmart.

Subsidiaries
Its major subsidiary, China Petroleum and Chemical Corporation Limited, commonly referred to as "Sinopec Limited", is listed on the Hong Kong Stock Exchange and the Shanghai Stock Exchange.

Sinopec Ltd. is involved in the production of various petroleum products, including gasoline, diesel, jet fuel, kerosene, ethylene, synthetic fibers, synthetic rubber, synthetic resins, and chemical fertilizers, in addition to exploration of crude oil and natural gas within China.
It also produces several biofuels such as biodiesel and green jet fuel, from waste vegetable oil. It also produces ethanol.

References

External links

China Petrochemical Corporation

Sinopec
Holding companies of China
Oil companies of China
Government-owned companies of China
National oil and gas companies
Petrochemical companies
Energy companies established in 1998
Non-renewable resource companies established in 1998
Chinese companies established in 1998
Dongcheng District, Beijing